Eldyak (Yäldäk) is a rural locality (a village) in Staroyantuzovsky Selsoviet, Dyurtyulinsky District, Bashkortostan, Russia. The population was 46 as of 2010. There are 2 streets.

Geography 
Eldyak is located 30 km east of Dyurtyuli (the district's administrative centre) by road. Turbek is the nearest rural locality.

References 

Rural localities in Dyurtyulinsky District